Doris Meister (born 9 January 1952) is a German former swimmer. She competed in the women's 100 metre backstroke at the 1968 Summer Olympics.

References

External links
 

1952 births
Living people
German female swimmers
Olympic swimmers of West Germany
Swimmers at the 1968 Summer Olympics
People from Aschaffenburg (district)
Sportspeople from Lower Franconia